Johnny Lever (born John Prakash Rao Janumala; 14 August 1957) is an Indian actor and popular comedian who is known for his works in Hindi cinema. He is one of the first stand-up comedians in India. He is the recipient of numerous accolades, including thirteen Filmfare Awards nominations in Filmfare Award for Best Performance in a Comic Role, and has won the award twice, for his work in Deewana Mastana (1997) and Dulhe Raja (1998). He began his career in 1984, and has acted in more than three hundred Hindi films.

Early life
Lever was born on 14 August 1957 in a Telugu Christian family in Prakasam, Andhra Pradesh. His father worked as an operator in Hindustan Unilever plant where he also worked as a labourer for six years. Lever was brought up in King's Circle area of Dharavi in Mumbai. His mother tongue is Telugu and is fluent in Hindi, Marathi, English and Tulu. He is the eldest in the family consisting of three sisters and two brothers (including his younger brother Jimmy Moses).

Lever studied in Andhra education society English high school until the seventh grade as he could not study further because of financial problems in his family. As a result, he decided to leave school and started working odd jobs, such as selling pens on the streets of Mumbai by mimicking some famous Hindi film stars of that time and dancing to the songs of Hindi film stars. He also spent his early years in Yakutpura, an old city of Hyderabad, where he learnt the unique style of comedy acting.

During a Hindustan Unilever company function, he mimicked a few senior officers, and from that day on, the workers said he is Johnny Lever. When he later joined the film industry, he decided to use Johnny Lever as his screen name.

Career

Stand-up comedy career
He started to perform stand-up comedy in musical shows (orchestras), Tabassum Hit Parade and after earning fame, joined the group of Kalyanji-Anandji, a music direction duo. Lever is one of the first stand-up comedian in India and widely regarded as pioneer of stand-up comedy profession in India. Even before joining Hindustan Unilever (HUL), he was giving stage performances. Because of his growing absenteeism and since he was earning well from stage shows, he quit HUL in the year 1981. He did a lot of shows and world tours with them, one of his first big tours being with Amitabh Bachchan in 1982. At one of his shows, actor Sunil Dutt noticed his talent and potential and offered him his first movie Dard Ka Rishta.

He recorded a comedy cassette called Hasi Ke Hangame which gave him recognition at homes via the audio mode. During this period, he also did a few commercials for Kachua chhap incense, directed by Shekhar Kapur. In 1986, he performed in a charity show Hope 86 in front of members of the Hindi film industry as a filler. His talent was recognized, which resulted in producer Gul Anand offering him the film Jalwa, alongside Naseeruddin Shah.

Film career

1980s
Lever got his first break in Tum Par Hum Qurban, in which the famous TV and stage compère and yesteryears actress Baby Tabassum launched her son Hoshang Govil as the leading man, and then with the film Dard Ka Rishta, thanks to Tabassum and the late Sunil Dutt. Since then, he has acted in more than 350 films including films such as Tezaab, Kasam, Khatarnak and Kishen Kanhaiya . After Dard Ka Rishta, he was seen in Jalwa, Hero Hiralal with Naseeruddin Shah.

1990s
His first major success came with Baazigar, and after that he was seen in movies as a supporting actor/comedian. Despite being busy with his movie roles, he continued to do live shows. One of his most memorable live performances was an impersonation of Michael Jackson at the 1999 Filmfare Awards. His most acclaimed performance was the character of "Babulal" in the film, Baazigar, directed by Abbas-Mustan. He is also remembered for some of his other famous characters, like "Chotta Chattri", "Aslam Bhai", etc.

2010s
He also acted in a Tulu movie, Rang. His first Tamil feature film was Anbirkku Alavillai released in 2011. He also starred in a Kannada film, Gara.

Television career
Lever's first appeared in an episode of sitcom Zabaan Sambhalke as Johnny Utolandand in 1993. Lever also appeared on Zee TV in his own show, Johny Aala Re. In 2007, he appeared as a judge on the stand-up reality show Comedy Circus. In 2017 Lever joined the cast of Partners as Commissioner Googol Chatterjee.

He is the president of MAAM (Mimicry Artist Association Mumbai), and has done thousands of live shows all over the world.

Personal life
He married Sujatha Lever in 1984 and has two children Jamie and Jessy. His younger brother, Jimmy Moses, is also a comedian and mimicry artist.

Lever is a practicing Christian. When asked about his transition, Lever replied:

It was God's will. I had always been a religious person, but one incident changed my life. My son was diagnosed with throat tumor. I was helpless and turned to God for help. I stopped working in films and spent all my time praying for him. Ten days later, when he was taken for a test, the doctors were surprised because the cancer had vanished. It was the beginning of a new life for me.

Filmography

Films

As playback singer

As dubbing artist

Television shows

Web series

Awards and nominations

See also
 List of Indian comedians
 List of stand-up comedians
 Johny Aala Re

References

External links

Johny Lever on Bollywood Hungama

Indian male film actors
Indian comedians
Male actors in Hindi cinema
Indian stand-up comedians
Living people
Telugu people
Filmfare Awards winners
Indian Christians
People from Prakasam district
Male actors from Andhra Pradesh
Screen Awards winners
Zee Cine Awards winners
1957 births